Erwin Lienhard (16 January 1957 – 25 January 2019) was a Swiss professional racing cyclist. He rode in one edition of the Tour de France, three editions of the Giro d'Italia and one edition of the Vuelta a España.

He was the father of racing cyclist Fabian Lienhard.

References

External links
 

1957 births
2019 deaths
Swiss male cyclists
People from Dielsdorf District
Sportspeople from the canton of Zürich
Tour de Suisse stage winners